Don Baird (born 29 May 1951) is a retired male pole vaulter from Australia. He set his personal best (5.53 metres) on 16 April 1977 at a meet in Long Beach. He was coached by pole vault coach Walter Chisholm.

Achievements

References
 trackfield.brinkster

1951 births
Living people
Australian male pole vaulters
Athletes (track and field) at the 1974 British Commonwealth Games
Athletes (track and field) at the 1978 Commonwealth Games
Commonwealth Games gold medallists for Australia
Commonwealth Games silver medallists for Australia
Athletes (track and field) at the 1976 Summer Olympics
Olympic athletes of Australia
Commonwealth Games medallists in athletics
20th-century Australian people
Medallists at the 1974 British Commonwealth Games
Medallists at the 1978 Commonwealth Games